Camping Out may refer to:

Camping
Camping Out (film), a 1919 short film directed by and starring Fatty Arbuckle
Camping Out, a 1934 animated short film starring Mickey Mouse

See also
Camping (disambiguation)